WSKY-FM (97.3 MHz) is a commercial radio station licensed to Micanopy, Florida, and serving the Gainesville-Ocala radio market.  The station airs a talk radio format and is owned by Audacy, Inc.

WSKY carries a local weekday morning talk and information show, followed by nationally syndicated talk programs.  They include Brian Kilmeade, Sean Hannity, Mark Levin, Ben Shapiro, Coast to Coast AM with George Noory and This Morning, America's First News with Gordon Deal.   Weekends feature shows on money, health, real estate, law, gardening, horses, computers and cigars, some of which are paid brokered programming.  Hosts include Kim Komando, Bill Handel, Clark Howard and Bill Cunningham.  Most hours begin with world and national news from ABC News Radio.

History 
On September 7, 1985, the station first signed on at 97.7 FM as WGLV, an adult contemporary music station known as "Gainesville's Love 98."  WGLV was co-owned with WGGG, a longtime legendary Top 40 station in the market, and tried to take advantage of the connection by hiring legendary WGGG personality "Boomer" Hough as its first morning show host.  However, Hough's show lasted only a few months.  WGLV tried to further bank on the legendary WGGG call sign in 1987 by adopting a 1970s-based oldies format as WGGG-FM and declaring "The Legend is Back!"  This, too, proved short-lived. After WGGG-AM-FM were sold in 1989, WGGG-FM became WLCL, a soft AC station branded as "Clear FM".

From 1993 until the debut of WSKY in 1998 (except for a brief period during which it programmed oldies as WGGO "Go 97.7"), the station was known as WRRX "97-X".  At that time, the station featured an adult album alternative format which was partially programmed via satellite from an outside provider, and locally in certain dayparts, featuring an eclectic variety of music.  97-X had a small yet loyal following in the local Gainesville music scene.

97-X was sold to Entercom in March 1998, for a price tag of $2.8 million.  Entercom switched the call letters to WSKY-FM and changed frequencies to 97.3 MHz on June 7, 1998, boosting the signal to 13,500 watts from its previous 2,600 watts.  The antenna height was nearly doubled to 948 feet from its previous 495-foot tower.  This gave WSKY better coverage of the Gainesville-Ocala radio market, putting a high-quality signal over both cities.  The station also switched to its current talk radio format. WSKY has since boosted its power to 50,000 watts effective radiated power (ERP) but reduced its height above average terrain (HAAT) to 492 feet.

Awards 
WSKY was given an award for its news reporting during the 2004 hurricane season, which hit WSKY's broadcast area especially hard.

References

External links

SKY-FM
News and talk radio stations in the United States
Radio stations established in 1985
Audacy, Inc. radio stations
1985 establishments in Florida